Jean-Michel Mipoka (born 28 September 1985) is a French-Congolese professional basketball player for Orléans Loiret of the LNB Pro B.

He formerly played for BCM Gravelines of the LNB Pro A.

Professional career
Mipoka started his pro career with Cholet Basket of the LNB Pro A.

From 2006 to 2010 he played with Olympique Antibes, UJAP Quimper 29 and Saint-Vallier  in the LNB Pro B.

In June 2010, he signed with Chorale Roanne Basket for the 2010–11 season.

From 2011 to 2013 he played with Limoges CSP. In June 2013, he signed with SLUC Nancy Basket for the 2013–14 season.

In July 2014, he signed with Rouen Métropole Basket, for the 2014–15 season.

National team career
Mipoka has been a member of the Republic of the Congo men's national basketball team.

References

External links
LNB Pro A profile
Eurobasket.com profile
Euroleague.net profile
FIBA.com profile

1985 births
Living people
BCM Gravelines players
Black French sportspeople
Cholet Basket players
Chorale Roanne Basket players
Élan Béarnais players
Fos Provence Basket players
French men's basketball players
Limoges CSP players
Olympique Antibes basketball players
Orléans Loiret Basket players
French sportspeople of Republic of the Congo descent
Republic of the Congo men's basketball players
Republic of the Congo people of French descent
Saint-Vallier Basket Drôme players
SLUC Nancy Basket players
Small forwards
Sportspeople from Toulouse
UJAP Quimper 29 players